Lahure ( is a 1989 Nepali film directed by Tulsi Ghimire. It starred Shrawan Ghimire, Tripti Nadakar and Tulsi Ghimire. The music of the film was composed by Ranjit Gazmer. Binod Pradhan was the cinematographer. The movie was mostly shot at Namchi, South Sikkim Film was biggest commercial successful at the box office. It celebrate 151 days in theatre.

Plot
Lahure is based on the story of the brave Gorkha soldiers and the sacrifices made by them and their families. Starring Shrawan Ghimire, Pradip Pakhrin, Tripti.

Soundtrack

References

External links
 Lahure songs

Nepali-language films
1989 films
Nepalese war films
Films shot in Sikkim
Films directed by Tulsi Ghimire
Films scored by Ranjit Gazmer